The 1998 SEAT Open was a women's tennis tournament played on indoor carpet courts in Kockelscheuer, Luxembourg that was part of Tier III of the 1998 WTA Tour. It was the third edition of the tournament and was held from 26 October until 31 October 1998. Second-seeded Mary Pierce won the singles title and earned $27,000 first-prize money.

Finals

Singles

 Mary Pierce defeated  Silvia Farina 6–0, 2–0 ret.
 It was Pierce's 6th title of the year and the 17th of her career.

Doubles

 Elena Likhovtseva /  Ai Sugiyama defeated  Larisa Neiland /  Elena Tatarkova 6–7, 6–3, 2–0 (Neiland and Tatarkova retired)
 It was Likhovtseva's 2nd title of the year and the 4th of her career. It was Sugiyama's 4th title of the year and the 8th of her career.

References

External links
 ITF tournament edition details
 Tournament draws

SEAT Open
Luxembourg Open
1998 in Luxembourgian tennis